Alex Geringas (born March 2, 1971) is an American  composer and songwriter based in Los Angeles, United States.

Awards 
 1998	 Echo Award – Best Newcomer – Die 3. Generation
 2003	 Echo Award – Best Video – No Angels  "Something about us"
 2013 BMI London Award – Kelly Clarkson  "Dark Side"
 2013 Grammy Award – "Best Pop Vocal Album", Kelly Clarkson (contains "Dark Side")
 2014 BMI Pop Award – Kelly Clarkson  "Dark Side"
 2015 Emmy Nomination – Original Theme "Who's da King" / All Hail King Julien
 2017 Annie Nomination – Outstanding Achievement in Music for an animated TV Show for "Home : Adventures with Tip and Oh"

References

External links 
 
 

Living people
1971 births
Musicians from Los Angeles
Musicians from Hamburg
Soviet emigrants to the United States